Boisseuil is a commune in the Haute-Vienne department in the Nouvelle-Aquitaine region in western France.
Inhabitants are known as Boisseuillais in French.

Geography
The river Briance forms most of the commune's southern border.

See also
 Communes of the Haute-Vienne department

References

Communes of Haute-Vienne